1205 Ebella, provisional designation , is a relatively eccentric asteroid from the central regions of the asteroid belt, approximately 5.5 kilometers in diameter. It was discovered by astronomer Karl Reinmuth at Heidelberg Observatory on 6 October 1931. The asteroid was named after German astronomer Martin Ebell.

Orbit and classification 

Ebella orbits the Sun in the central main-belt at a distance of 1.8–3.2 AU once every 4.04 years (1,474 days). Its orbit has an eccentricity of 0.27 and an inclination of 9° with respect to the ecliptic. As no precoveries were taken and no prior identifications were made, the asteroid's observation arc begins at Heidelberg with its official discovery observation.

Physical characteristics

Diameter and albedo 

According to the survey carried out by NASA's Wide-field Infrared Survey Explorer with its subsequent NEOWISE mission, Ebella measures 5.474 kilometers in diameter and its surface has an albedo of 0.214, which is typical for stony S-type asteroids.

Based on a generic magnitude-to-diameter conversion, it measures 6.0 kilometers in diameter using an absolute magnitude of 13.50 with an assumed albedo of 0.20.

Lightcurve 

As of 2017, no rotational lightcurve of Ebella has been obtained from photometric observations. The asteroid's  rotation period, poles and shape still remain unknown.

Naming 

This minor planet was named after Carl Wilhelm Ludwig Martin Ebell (1871–1944) an astronomer from Neuruppin, Germany, who was on the editorial team of the renowned astronomical journal Astronomische Nachrichten. The official naming citation was published by Paul Herget in The Names of the Minor Planets in 1955.

References

External links 
 Asteroid Lightcurve Database (LCDB), query form (info )
 Dictionary of Minor Planet Names, Google books
 Asteroids and comets rotation curves, CdR – Observatoire de Genève, Raoul Behrend
 Discovery Circumstances: Numbered Minor Planets (1)-(5000) – Minor Planet Center
 
 

001205
Discoveries by Karl Wilhelm Reinmuth
Named minor planets
19311006